Aenictus binghami is a species of tiger's eye-colored army ant found in Vietnam, Laos, Myanmar, and Thailand. Colonies have been described in detail in Pak Chong District of Thailand, and Cuc Phuong National Park in Vietnam, where a queen was noted in a bivouac at nighttime.

References

Dorylinae
Hymenoptera of Asia
Insects described in 1900